Baden Kerr (born 9 June 1989) is a New Zealand rugby union player. He plays mainly as a fly-half, but is known to also play as a fullback. He previously played for Fijian Drua in Super Rugby. He also played two seasons with the Blues in Super Rugby.

Having worked his way through the Counties-Manukau system Kerr had previously been a member of the Chiefs Development squad, but his inclusion in Kirwan's Blues squad for 2013 gave him his first opportunity to play at the Super Rugby level. After sitting out the 2014 season through injury, he signed a one-year agreement with Saracens.

References

External links
 itsrugby.co.uk profile

1989 births
Living people
New Zealand rugby union players
Rugby union fly-halves
Blues (Super Rugby) players
Counties Manukau rugby union players
People educated at Rosehill College
People from Papakura
Bedford Blues players
Saracens F.C. players
Mie Honda Heat players
Fijian Drua players
Rugby union fullbacks
Rugby union players from Auckland